Carramar may refer to:

 Carramar, New South Wales, suburb of Sydney, New South Wales
 Carramar, Western Australia, suburb of Perth, Western Australia